Liraglutide, sold under the brand name Victoza among others, is an anti-diabetic medication used to treat type 2 diabetes, and chronic obesity. In diabetes it is a less preferred agent compared to metformin. Its effects on long-term health outcomes like heart disease and life expectancy are unclear. It is given by injection under the skin.

Common side effects include low blood sugar, nausea, dizziness, abdominal pain, and pain at the site of injection. Gastrointestinal side-effects tend to be strongest at the beginning of treatment period and subside over time. Other serious side effects may include medullary thyroid cancer, angioedema, pancreatitis, gallbladder disease, and kidney problems. Use in pregnancy and breastfeeding is of unclear safety. Liraglutide is a glucagon-like peptide-1 receptor agonist (GLP-1 receptor agonist) also known as incretin mimetics. It works by increasing insulin release from the pancreas and decreases excessive glucagon release.

Liraglutide was approved for medical use in the European Union in 2009, and in the United States in 2010. In 2020, it was the 146th most commonly prescribed medication in the United States, with more than 4million prescriptions.

Medical uses
Liraglutide is a medication used for the treatment of type 2 diabetes or obesity.

Type 2 diabetes
Liraglutide improves control of blood glucose. In patients with high cardiovascular risk, liraglutide has been shown to reduce the risk for first occurrence of death from cardiovascular causes, nonfatal myocardial infarction, or nonfatal stroke. ADA guidelines currently consider liraglutide a first line pharmacologic therapy for type 2 diabetes (usually together with metformin), specifically for patients with atherosclerotic cardiovascular disease or obesity. A 2011 Cochrane review showed a HbA1c reduction of 0.24% more with liraglutide 1.8 mg compared to insulin glargine, 0.33% more than exenatide 10 µg twice daily, sitagliptin and rosiglitazone. In an RCT comparing liraglutide, glargine, glimepiride, and sitagliptin (all added to metformin) with a follow-up of 5 years, glargine and liraglutide were modestly more effective in achieving and maintaining target HbA1c, with no difference in outcomes of microvascular and cardiovascular disease.

Obesity
Liraglutide may also be used together with diet and exercise for chronic weight management in adults. Liraglutide has been shown to lead to greater weight loss than other glucagon-like peptide analogues.

Adverse effects

Thyroid cancer
At exposures eight times greater than those used in humans, liraglutide caused a statistically significant increase in thyroid tumors in rats.  The clinical relevance of these findings is unknown. In clinical trials, the rate of thyroid tumors in patients treated with liraglutide was 1.3 per 1000 patient years (4 people) compared to 1.0 per 1000 patients (1 person) in comparison groups. The sole person in the comparator group and four of the five persons in the liraglutide group had serum markers (elevated calcitonin) suggestive of pre-existing disease at baseline.

The FDA said serum calcitonin, a biomarker of medullary thyroid cancer, was slightly increased in liraglutide patients, but still within normal ranges, and it required ongoing monitoring for 15 years in a cancer registry.

Pancreatitis
In 2013, a group at Johns Hopkins reported an apparently statistically significant association between hospitalization for acute pancreatitis and prior treatment with GLP-1 derivatives (such as exenatide) and DPP-4 inhibitors (such as sitagliptin). In response, the United States FDA and the European Medicines Agency conducted a review of all available data regarding the possible connection between incretin mimetics and pancreatitis or pancreatic cancer.  In a joint 2014 letter to the New England Journal of Medicine, the agencies concluded that "A pooled analysis of data from 14,611 patients with type 2 diabetes from 25 clinical trials in the sitagliptin database provided no compelling evidence of an increased risk of pancreatitis or pancreatic cancer" and "Both agencies agree that assertions concerning a causal association between incretin-based drugs and pancreatitis or pancreatic cancer, as expressed recently in the scientific literature and in the media, are inconsistent with the current data. The FDA and the EMA have not reached a final conclusion at this time regarding such a causal relationship. Although the totality of the data that have been reviewed provides reassurance, pancreatitis will continue to be considered a risk associated with these drugs until more data are available; both agencies continue to investigate this safety signal."

Pharmacodynamics

Liraglutide is an acylated glucagon-like peptide-1 (GLP-1) agonist, derived from human GLP-1-(7-37), a less common form of endogenous GLP-1.

It reduces meal-related hyperglycemia (for 24 hours after administration) by increasing insulin secretion (only) when required by increasing glucose levels, delaying gastric emptying, and suppressing prandial glucagon secretion.

Liraglutide leads to insulin release in pancreatic beta cells in the presence of elevated blood glucose. This insulin secretion subsides as glucose concentrations decrease and approach euglycemia (normal blood glucose level). It also decreases glucagon secretion in a glucose-dependent manner and delays gastric emptying. Unlike endogenous GLP-1, liraglutide is stable against metabolic degradation by peptidases, with a plasma half-life of 13 hours.

Pharmacokinetics
Endogenous GLP-1 has a plasma half-life of 1.5–2 minutes due to degradation by the ubiquitous enzymes, dipeptidyl peptidase-4 (DPP4) and neutral endopeptidases (NEP).  The half-life after intramuscular injection is approximately half an hour, so even administered this way, it has limited use as a therapeutic agent.  The metabolically active forms of GLP-1 are the endogenous GLP-1-(7-36)NH2 and the more rare GLP-1-(7-37). The prolonged action of liraglutide is achieved by attaching a fatty acid molecule at one position of the GLP-1-(7-37) molecule, enabling it to both self-associate and bind to albumin within the subcutaneous tissue and bloodstream. The active GLP-1 is then released from albumin at a slow, consistent rate. Albumin binding also results in slower degradation and reduced renal elimination compared to that of GLP-1-(7-37).

Society and culture

Brand names
Liraglutide is marketed under the brand name Victoza in the U.S., U.K. UAE, Kuwait, India, Iran, Canada, Europe, Japan and Philippines. It has been launched in Germany, Italy, Denmark, the Netherlands, Sweden, Japan, Canada, the United States, France, Indonesia, Malaysia and Singapore.  Liraglutide is also known to be marketed as Saxenda in Norway, Australia, Indonesia, Iran, Israel, Canada, Brazil, Switzerland, The United Kingdom, Ireland, Poland and the U.S.

Marketing
Liraglutide was approved by the U.S. Food and Drug Administration (FDA) in 2014, and by the European Medicines Agency (EMA) in 2015, for adults with a body mass index (BMI) of 30 or greater (obesity) or a BMI of 27 or greater (overweight) who have at least one weight-related condition. Liraglutide was approved by the FDA in 2019, for treatment of children 10 years or older with type 2 diabetes, making it the first non-insulin drug approved to treat type 2 diabetes in children since metformin was approved in 2000.

Novo Nordisk stated that it plans to use 500 of its 3,000-strong sales force in the United States to promote Saxenda in 2015, because it is considered to have the potential for sales of $1 billion a year within 8–10 years of launch around the world.  Analysts at Citi Research concur, assuming that the drug will reach less than 0.5 percent of the 107 million people in the United States classified as obese, and a daily price of $30 over 6 to 12 months' use. The company estimates that it has spent about $1 billion over ten years to take Saxenda from research to marketing.

Controversy
In 2010, Novo Nordisk breached the ABPI's code of conduct by failing to provide information about side effects, and by promoting it prior to being granted market authorization.

In 2012, the non-profit consumer advocacy group Public Citizen petitioned the U.S. Food and Drug Administration (FDA) to immediately remove liraglutide from the market because they concluded that risks of thyroid cancer and pancreatitis outweigh any documented benefits.

In 2017, Novo Nordisk agreed to pay $58.65 million to settle multiple whistleblower lawsuits alleging that the company had illegally marketed, promoted, and sold Victoza for off-label uses (such as for type 1 diabetes) in violation of the Federal Food, Drug, and Cosmetic Act and the False Claims Act. Novo Nordisk paid an additional $1.45 million to the states of California and Illinois to settle whistleblower cases alleging fraud against private commercial health insurers.

References

External links 
 

Wikipedia medicine articles ready to translate
Glucagon-like peptide-1 receptor agonists
Antiobesity drugs
Peptide hormones